Prodotia iostoma is a species of sea snail, a marine gastropod mollusk in the family Prodotiidae.

Description

Distribution
This marine species occurs in the Indian Ocean off Aldabra and the Mascarenes; also off New Caledonia and  New Zealand.

References

 Petit de la Saussaye S. (1853). Notice sur le genre Phos de Denys de Montfort, avec la description de deux espèces nouvelles. Journal de Conchyliologie. 3: 235–245, pl. 8.
 Kilburn, R.N. & Rippey, E. (1982) Sea Shells of Southern Africa. Macmillan South Africa, Johannesburg, xi + 249 pp.
 Taylor, J.D. (1973). Provisional list of the mollusca of Aldabra Atoll.
 Kilburn R.N., Marais J.P. & Fraussen K. (2010) Buccinidae. pp. 16–52, in: Marais A.P. & Seccombe A.D. (eds), Identification guide to the seashells of South Africa. Volume 1. Groenkloof: Centre for Molluscan Studies. 376
 Drivas, J.; Jay, M. (1987). Coquillages de La Réunion et de l'Île Maurice. Collection Les Beautés de la Nature. Delachaux et Niestlé: Neuchâtel. . 159 pp.
 Kay, E.A. (1979) Hawaiian marine shells. Reef and shore fauna of Hawaii. Section 4: Mollusca. Bernice P. Bishop Museum Special Publications, 64, xviii + 1–653.
 Steyn, D.G. & Lussi, M. (1998) Marine Shells of South Africa. An Illustrated Collector’s Guide to Beached Shells. Ekogilde Publishers, Hartebeespoort, South Africa, ii + 264 pp.
 Spencer, H.G., Marshall, B.A. & Willan, R.C. (2009). Checklist of New Zealand living Mollusca. pp 196–219. in: Gordon, D.P. (ed.) New Zealand inventory of biodiversity. Volume one. Kingdom Animalia: Radiata, Lophotrochozoa, Deuterostomia. Canterbury University Press, Christchurch.
 Liu J.Y. [Ruiyu] (ed.). (2008). Checklist of marine biota of China seas. China Science Press. 1267 pp.

External links
 Souverbie [S.-M.] & Montrouzier [X.]. (1864). Descriptions d’espèces nouvelles de l’Archipel Calédonien. Journal de Conchyliologie. 12: 261–275, pl. 10

Prodotiidae
Gastropods described in 1834
Taxa named by John Edward Gray